Frau-Holle-Teich is a pond in Hoher Meißner, Werra-Meißner-Kreis, Hesse, Germany. The pond lies at an elevation of ca. 623 m.

References 

Lakes of Hesse
LFrau Holle Teich
Ponds of Germany